Refiloe is the second studio album by South African hip hop recording artist Cassper Nyovest, released initially on 31 October 2015 at his Fill Up The Dome concert at the Ticket Pro Dome in Johannesburg.

Refiloe, which means "we have been given", is Nyovest's real first name and is a unisex name in Setswana.

Background and recording 
Guest appearances on this album include fellow South African recording artists Anatii, Riky Rick, Carpo and Doc Shebeleza, as well as international recording artists Stonebwoy and American hip hop recording artists DJ Drama, Casey Veggies and The Game.

Singles 
The first single off the album, titled "Mama I Made It" was released on 14 August 2015, followed by the promotional singles "Bheki'ndaba Zakho" released on 25 October 2015 and "No Worries" released on 30 October 2015. The album's second single "Le Mpitse" was serviced to urban contemporary radio stations on 3 December 2015. The music video which was directed by Kyle White and produced by Visual Content Gang, was released on Nyovest's YouTube account on 17 December 2015.

On 20 January 2016 Nyovest released an extended version of "Malome" as the album's third single.

Commercial performance 
The album was first released on 31 October 2015 at Nyovest's show at the Ticket Pro Dome in Johannesburg, whereby the purchase of each ticket by each concert goer, resulted in each one of them receiving an accompanying copy of his second studio album. This resulted in sales of over 20,000 copies of the album in a few hours of its first day.

Refiloe debuted a few days later on 6 November 2015 on iTunes. Within 30 minutes of being made available for download, the album peaked at top of the South African iTunes chart across all genres.

As of 9 December 2015, Refiloe was certified Platinum by Recording Industry of South Africa (RISA) for selling 40,000 copies domestically.

Track listing
From Connect.

All lyrics were written and composed by Refiloe Maele Phoolo;co-writers are listed
Notes

"War Ready" samples "Izinja Zam" written by Kabelo Mabalane, Tokollo Tshabalala & Zwai Bala and performed by TKZee.

"Find My Way" samples "Rainbow" written and performed by Black Motion featuring Xoli M

"Le Mpitse" samples "Mpitse" written and performed by Hip Hop Panstula

"Monate So" samples "Monate So" written and performed by Doc Shebeleza

Certifications and sales

Release history

References 

2015 albums
Cassper Nyovest albums
Family Tree Records albums
Albums produced by DJ Maphorisa